Jaylin Michael Williams (born June 29, 2002) is an Vietnamese American professional basketball player for the Oklahoma City Thunder of the National Basketball Association (NBA). He played college basketball for the Arkansas Razorbacks. He was selected by the Thunder in the second round of the 2022 NBA draft.

High school career
Williams played basketball for Northside High School in Fort Smith, Arkansas, where he was teammates with Isaiah Joe, later his professional teammate with the Thunder. As a sophomore, he helped his team reach the Class 7A state final. In his junior season, Williams averaged 16 points, 11 rebounds and three blocks per game, and was named Arkansas Division I Player of the Year by the Northwest Arkansas Democrat-Gazette.
He led his team to the Class 6A state title and was named tournament MVP after recording 20 points and 16 rebounds in the title game. As a senior, Williams averaged 18.7 points, 12.2 rebounds, 2.7 assists and 2.5 blocks per game, earning Arkansas Gatorade Player of the Year honors and repeating as Arkansas Division I Player of the Year. A consensus four-star recruit, he committed to playing college basketball for Arkansas over an offer from Auburn, among other programs.

College career
As a freshman at Arkansas, Williams averaged 3.7 points and 4.7 rebounds per game. He became a regular starter in his sophomore season. Williams averaged 10.9 points and 9.8 rebounds per game, receiving first-team All-Southeastern Conference (SEC) honors from the league's coaches. He was a second-team All-SEC selection by the Associated Press and made the All-Defensive Team. Williams led the NCAA Division I with 54 charges drawn and grabbed 364 rebounds, setting a program single-season record. He declared for the NBA draft and opted to forgo his remaining college eligibility.

Professional career

Oklahoma City Thunder (2022–present) 
Williams was selected by the Oklahoma City Thunder in the second round of the 2022 NBA draft with the 34th overall pick, becoming the first player of Vietnamese descent to be drafted in the NBA. Williams joined the Thunder's 2022 NBA Summer League team. In his Summer League debut, Williams scored two points and six rebounds in a 98–77 win against the Utah Jazz in the Salt Lake City Summer League. On July 19, 2022, Williams signed with the Thunder.

References

External links
Arkansas Razorbacks bio

2002 births
Living people
American men's basketball players
African-American basketball players
American sportspeople of Vietnamese descent
Arkansas Razorbacks men's basketball players
Basketball players from Arkansas
Oklahoma City Thunder draft picks
Oklahoma City Thunder players
Power forwards (basketball)
Sportspeople from Fort Smith, Arkansas
American people of Vietnamese descent